The 2019 Super Cup was the second edition of the Super Cup and 40th season of the main club knockout football competition in India. The competition is sponsored by Hero MotoCorp and is officially known as the Hero Super Cup. The competition began with the qualifiers on 15 March 2019 at Kalinga Stadium in Bhubaneshwar and was concluded with the final on 13 April 2019. Bengaluru FC were the defending champions, but lost to Chennai City F.C. in the quarter-finals. FC Goa won the title by defeating Chennaiyin FC 2–1 in the final.

Teams
A total of 16 teams are participating in the competition proper. The top six teams from both the I-League and Indian Super League qualified for the Super Cup automatically while the bottom four sides have participated in the qualifiers.

Round dates

Bracket

Qualification round
After the conclusion of the I-League and Indian Super League seasons, the All India Football Federation announced the draw for the qualification round of the Super Cup. Before the qualification round, seven I-League clubs — Minerva Punjab, East Bengal, Mohun Bagan, NEROCA, Gokulam Kerala, Aizawl, and Chennai City — announced they would withdraw from Super Cup, citing "unfair treatment to I-League clubs."

Round of 16
Chennai City F.C. had announced they would withdraw from the tournament along with other I-League clubs but eventually decided to participate.

Quarter-finals

Semi-finals

Final

Top scorers

Notes

References

External links

 
2019 Super Cup
2018–19 in Indian football
Indian Super Cup
India